Žaloviče is a village in the Municipality of Šmarješke Toplice in southeastern Slovenia. The area is part of the historical region of Lower Carniola. The municipality is now included in the Southeast Slovenia Statistical Region. 

The local parish church is dedicated to Saint Ulrich and belongs to the Parish of Šmarjeta. It was built in 1807.

References

External links
Žaloviče at Geopedia

Populated places in the Municipality of Šmarješke Toplice